The Grilled Cheese Truck is a food truck company serving gourmet "chef driven" grilled cheese sandwiches. The company started in Los Angeles in 2009, and has since expanded throughout Southern California, Phoenix, San Antonio and Austin.

Overview

The Grilled Cheese Truck started as a joint venture between Dave Danhi (a Los Angeles-based chef) and Michele Grant (chef and entrepreneur).

Danhi devised the idea when he competed in the 7th Annual Grilled Cheese Invitational, a grilled cheese competition that takes place every Spring in Los Angeles, California. As he left the competition and saw the food trucks lined up outside, as well as the interest in grilled cheese from the competition, he got the idea to open the "grilled cheese food truck". After several discussions with Grant, they decided to open up a gourmet grilled cheese truck together in Los Angeles. Referencing both of their culinary backgrounds, the tag line for the truck is: "Chef driven Grilled Cheese, ‘cause that’s how we roll..."

The Grilled Cheese Truck has been awarded accolades including "10 Best Grilled Cheese Trucks" and one of the "Top 10 Sandwiches in LA".  Grant, Danhi and the truck have had television appearances on The Price Is Right,  Unwrapped, House of Food, Be Our Guest, The Rachael Ray Show, The Joan and Melissa Show, and The Cooking Channel. Danhi's grilled cheese recipes have appeared in talk shows, magazines, blogs  and cookbooks.History and business activity
2009 - 2012: In 2009, The Grilled Cheese Truck was launched in Los Angeles by Hollywood chef and entrepreneur Michele Grant and celebrity chef Dave Danhi. The company got its start with only one truck, but from the very beginning was a huge hit in the burgeoning Los Angeles Gourmet Food Truck scene.

Within six months Grant and Danhi had added a second truck and were expanding not just their physical reach within the greater Los Angeles area, but their social media reach as well.

By the third anniversary of the truck's opening, it had well upwards of 170,000 followers via Twitter and Facebook spanning the entire globe. The Grilled Cheese Truck had become a go to destination for tourists visiting Los Angeles, with several couples "meeting their match" while waiting in line to buy food from the truck.

During this time, according to Mr. Danhi who co-owned the business, the trucks generated gross revenues of $12,000 to $15,000 per week ($624,000 to $780,000 on an annualized basis) and net cash flow of $112,000 to $156,000 on an annualized basis. At the time of the completion of sale of The Grilled Cheese Truck to TRIG Acquisition at the end of October 2012, the company was on target to earn 1.4 million dollars in revenue by the end of the year.

2012 - 2016: On October 18, 2012, TRIG Acquisition 1, Inc., a Delaware Form 10 company, acquired The Grilled Cheese Truck brand. The company subsequently changed its name to The Grilled Cheese Truck, followed by another name change to American Patriot Brands (APB). In 2012, when Grant left the company, the company merged with TRIG Acquisition 1, Inc., forming Grilled Cheese Truck, Inc. This merger helped to expand the company to other markets and they have plans to become the first publicly traded food truck.  The company also enlisted General Wesley Clark (USA, Ret.) to help bring The Grilled Cheese Truck national. His primary focus is to help promote, identify, train, support and help franchise return service veterans with their own Grilled Cheese Trucks. APB never completed its franchise filings with the Federal Trade Commission or the State of California. At its peak, APB operated 10 trucks, eight of which were company-owned and two of which were licensed. APB did not disclose any per truck financial information in its SEC filings. During the period that the eight company-owned trucks operated, the company generated $3,650,021 in revenue and a net loss of $7,712,208, as disclosed in its last 10-K filing for the period ending December 31, 2014. APB is not current in its SEC filings as of January 18, 2017.

2016–July 2020: Big Cheese, Inc. was incorporated in Delaware on September 16, 2016. On October 4, 2016, it acquired the Grilled Cheese Truck brand with the attendant trademarks pursuant to an Intellectual Property Rights Purchase agreement with Dave Danhi, founder. Danhi had reacquired the rights on September 23, 2016, from APB, which had originally acquired the rights from Danhi. APB had re-positioned itself in the cannabis business, which created the opportunity for Danhi to reacquire the brand.

July 2020: On July 14, 2020, over social media, Danhi announced via social media that The Grilled Cheese Truck was to permanently close by the end of the month.

 Crowdfunding Endeavors 
Big Cheese Inc., owner of The Grilled Cheese Truck brand, filed a Form-C on January 18, 2017, to raise capital through JOBS Act securities regulations on Microventures. The Grilled Cheese Truck successfully closed the first ever Reg CF equity crowdfunding campaign by a food truck on Microventures with 332 investors investing $199,186 on April 1, 2017.

 Spotlight and awards 
The Grilled Cheese Truck has been awarded accolades including: 
 Los Angeles Hot List: 2011 #1 Food Truck in LA
 Los Angeles Times: Reader's Choice 2012 - Best Food Truck
 Culture Cheese Mag's 10 Best Grilled Cheese Trucks"
 LA Weekly's Top 10 Sandwiches in Los Angeles  
 Grant, Danhi and the truck have had television appearances on The Price is Right,  Unwrapped, House of Food, Be Our Guest, The Rachael Ray Show, The Joan and Melissa Show, and The Cooking Channel.  Thrillist Los Angeles' Best Food Trucks
 Relish: America's 10 Best Grilled Cheese Sandwiches
 The Daily Meal: Los Angeles 15 Best Food Trucks of 2013
 2013 #1 People's Choice Award at the Grilled Cheese Invitational
 Danhi's grilled cheese recipes have appeared in talk shows, magazines, blogs  and cookbooks. Including The Wakey Bacon Melt,'' The Cheesy Mac 'N Rib, and others.

See also

 Food cart
 List of food trucks
 Mobile catering
 Street food 
List of food companies

References 

13.  Goldstein, Peter J. ,US Foods VS Grilled Cheese Military, Inc 16K07489, FINRA Examination 20140407552, SEC, US Bankruptcy Court, Southern District of Florida, CASE 98-20914-RBR

Further reading
 Heather Taylor: Chef Speak: LA Street Food Fest. Huffington Post.
 Usheroff, Marni. "Gen. Clark Stumps for Vets, grilled cheese", ' ' Orange County Register ' ', Los Angeles, 10 November 2013. Retrieved on 13 March 2014.

External links
 
 The Grilled Cheese Truck Launches New Company Website at www.thegrilledcheesetruck.com
 Join the Grilled Cheese Truck Revolution: Solid Team + Big Expansion Plans
 The Grilled Cheese Truck Surpasses Minimum Funding Goal on MicroVentures and Unleashes Amplified Stretch Goal Perks
 The Grilled Cheese Truck Wins "Best Melt" Award from Time Out LA Magazine in Citywide Competition
 Chrissy Teigen Just Bought a Grilled Cheese Truck for Her Entire Production Crew
 American Meltdown's success comes from complicating the grilled cheese
 Community gets taste of MUNCH MADNESS
 The Daily Meal - Wakey Bacon Melt
 Community gets a taste of Munch Madness

Food and drink companies of the United States
Food trucks
Fast-food chains of the United States
Restaurants established in 2009
Companies based in Los Angeles
2009 establishments in California